Gustave Halphen (3 March 1810 in Paris–21 February 1872 in Paris) was a French diplomat and merchant.

He served as the Consul-General of France to the Sublime Porte (Istanbul). He served from 1852 to 1857 as the president and vice president of the Israelite Central Consistory of France. He was an officer of the Legion of Honour.

Works

Further reading

References

1810 births
1872 deaths
Diplomats from Paris
French Jews
Officiers of the Légion d'honneur
Commanders of the Order of Isabella the Catholic